Grace University was a private Christian university in Omaha, Nebraska. The university included undergraduate programs and the Grace University College of Professional and Graduate Studies. The university ceased all academic operations in May 2018.

History
Founded in 1943, Grace was originally intended as an interdenominational Bible institute where Christian men and women might further their theological training. The ten ministers and leaders counted as Grace's founders (August Ewert, Albert Ewert, Albert Schultz, Peter Kliewer, Paul Kuhlmann, Harold Burkholder, John Barkman, C.H. Suckau, Solomon Mouttet, and John Tieszen) originally met to discuss relocating the Bible department of Oklahoma Bible Academy. After several days of prayer, they decided that really what was needed was a place of higher education.

Originally called Grace Bible Institute, the school opened in the fall of 1943 with a grand total of 23 students and six professors. No tuition was charged; instead, students performed "30-minute jobs" every day. That changed in 1948 when the Accrediting Association required member schools to charge money. The original tuition was a flat $50 fee. In 1976, the school's name was changed to Grace College of the Bible. On July 1, 1995, the school officially became Grace University, emphasizing the school's new academic identity.

Grace's original home was in the former site of the recently shuttered Presbyterian Theological Seminary. In less than a year the college was able to purchase Stuntz Hall on South 10th Street in Omaha. The current campus includes that lot (the hall, by then known as Old Main, was torn down in the 1990s because of decay and safety concerns) as well as the surrounding city blocks. In 1977, the University purchased St. Catherine's Hospital Center for Continuing Care. This purchase added almost  to the campus and doubled facility space.

In 2017, a large portion of the school's campus was sold to Omaha Public Schools and announced plans to move to Blair, Nebraska and occupy the former campus of Dana College, which folded in 2010. On October 3, 2017, however Grace CEO Bill Bauhard announced that Grace University would halt operations at the end of the 2017–2018 academic year, citing financial and enrollment challenges. In response to Grace's closing and failure to occupy the former Dana campus, a group of Grace alumni and friends formed Charis University in early 2018, with the intent of opening on the Dana campus as a spiritual successor to Grace. Following the school's closure, the school's transcripts were transferred to the University of Nebraska–Lincoln for access by former students. Over its lifetime, more than 9000 students studied at the institution.

School programs

Academics

Grace University was accredited by the Higher Learning Commission. From the original three majors offered, Grace had grown to offer more than 40 undergraduate degrees and four graduate degrees. Popular programs included business, intercultural studies, communication, pastoral ministries, psychology, music, and teacher education. Approximately 500 students attended near its closing. Facilities included a state of the art library, a new gym (which hosted the NCCAA division II Volleyball National Championships in 2007 and 2008), a newly remodeled teacher education wing, and WiFi across campus.

The teacher education program was one of the biggest programs offered at Grace University. This program started in 1998 and strove to provide biblically integrated curriculum as well as challenging, up-to-date education.

Athletics
As a member of the National Christian College Athletic Association (NCCAA), Grace offered sports including basketball, volleyball, and soccer. They also briefly offered men's baseball for several years. The Lady Royals Volleyball team was named Division II National Champions of the NCCAA in 2005. In 2007 and 2008, Grace University hosted the NCCAA Division II Volleyball National Championship. The Royals head coach Courtney Moore played for Grace from 2005 to 2008 and was an assistant coach for two seasons. In the six seasons Coach Moore had been a part of Grace volleyball, the team has competed at the National level five times to bring home two final four finishes, one National Runner-up finish and one National Championship.

In 2008, the Men's Basketball Team won the NCCAA Div. II National Championship. Starter Paul Putz was named Tournament MVP. They were last coached by Willie Williams, who was a member of the 2008 National Championship team. The Royals won the NCCAA Div. II Central Region Championship in 2012 and 2013.

The men's soccer team was last coached by Paul Osborne, a former Royals soccer player. The soccer team made consecutive appearances in the NCCAA National Tournament in 2002 and 2003. The women's soccer team was last coached by Rich Locke, who played at the United States Naval Academy in Annapolis, Maryland.

The women's basketball team was the 2011 NCCAA Central Region Champion. This earned them a birth in the NCCAA Div. II National Tournament. They are coached by Chaia Huff. The Lady Royals won the NCCAA Div. II Central Region Championship in 2011 and 2012.

Arts and music
In the area of fine arts, the school had the Concert Band, the Women's Chorale, and most notably the Grace Chorale, which tours regularly across the United States and overseas. Instrumentalists had opportunities to join ensembles or the Community Concert Band. Annual musicals were held as well.

Values
Similar to other private religious schools in the state, Grace University's code of conduct provided students guidelines about morally acceptable behavior: no kissing, no prolonged hugs and no premarital sex. The school also forbid certain television channels which they assert consistently air material contrary to their values. HBO, MTV, and Comedy Central are among the restricted channels "because of the values they promote". The rules are laid out in a student handbook signed by students every year." The Resident Assistants and Deans were charged with upholding the school's code of conduct and holding the students accountable to the university's standards.

Ronald Kroll, who heads the accreditation commission for the Association for Biblical Higher Education (ABHE) in Orlando, said it shouldn't be surprising that schools like Grace University have strict rules on a wide range of issues: sex, alcohol, drugs, tobacco, pornography, and gambling. "It's the essence of who they are," Kroll said. "Since these institutions, by and large, are preparing people for biblical ministry or spiritual engagement, they have lifestyle expectations. These are non-negotiable issues."

Lesbian student expulsion controversy
During its operation, Grace University received federal Title IV funding under the Higher Education Act of 1965. This prohibited it from discriminating against individuals protected by the Civil Rights Act of 1964, including racial, ethnic, national and religious minorities, and women. However, this does not prohibit discrimination against students on the basis of sex or gender identity, and Grace University received national attention in 2013 after it expelled a lesbian student on the basis of her sexual orientation. Danielle Powell, who was in a prohibited same-sex relationship at the time, was expelled during her last semester at Grace when the university found she had violated the terms of the school's probationary yearlong restoration program. Powell had finished less than 60 percent of the semester when probation began. According to Title IV government requirements, when a student withdraws before that mark, the school must return government scholarship money, leaving her owing a $6300 bill. Despite that, Grace University clearly stated in writing that it was willing to provide transcripts and help Powell transfer to another university, according to Michael James, the school's executive vice president. All students, prior to admission, were required to sign a document affirming their willingness to abide by the university's community standards, which included a prohibition of same-sex romantic relationships.

Demographics
Enrollment for the final (2017–18) academic year was 287 students, only 33 of whom were freshmen, according to University CEO Bill Bauhard. This was 100 fewer than the previous year and about 50 fewer freshmen than anticipated, contributing to its announced closure at the end of the academic year, according to Bauhard.
 
A 2013 statistical report from Grace University revealed that of the 481 students enrolled, 23% reported themselves as being ethnic minorities. The top five states represented by the student body at the time were Nebraska, Iowa, Kansas, California and Colorado. In 2013, 97 students graduated with bachelor's degrees, 19 with master's degrees, and 10 with associate degrees.

Grace University also offered an online and on campus accelerated adult degree completion program for those who were not able to attend traditional undergraduate courses. The Midwestern Higher Education Compact Research Brief 2013 reported that Grace University was ranked Very High for institutional efficiency based on a 4-year graduation rate and ranked second out of 18 independent colleges and universities in Nebraska. The school was ranked Moderate for 6-year graduation rates.

References

External links
Official website
Grace University (Omaha, Nebraska, USA) at Global Anabaptist Mennonite Encyclopedia Online

Defunct private universities and colleges in Nebraska
Education in Omaha, Nebraska
Educational institutions established in 1943
Educational institutions disestablished in 2018
Evangelicalism in Nebraska
Nondenominational Christian universities and colleges
Liberal arts colleges in Nebraska
1943 establishments in Nebraska
2018 disestablishments in Nebraska